Neversink Reservoir is a reservoir in the New York City water supply system. It is located in the Catskill Mountain town of Neversink in Sullivan County, New York, 75 miles (120.6 km) northwest of the City.

It is fed by the Neversink River, the longest tributary of the Delaware River. Water collected in the reservoir in turn goes through the Neversink Tunnel a short distance east to Rondout Reservoir to be pooled with that from Pepacton and Cannonsville reservoirs which form the west-of-the-Hudson River components of the Delaware Aqueduct.  Together, they provide nearly half of the city's daily consumption.

History
Construction began in 1941, as the city realized that after World War II, it would need to increase its supply aggressively to meet explosive growth. Neversink was ultimately chosen after opposition from the region's trout fishermen and the geologic unfeasibility of the site scotched plans for smaller reservoirs along Willowemoc Creek.

Two local hamlets with long histories, Neversink and Bittersweet, were condemned and flooded to make the reservoir a reality (the former was relocated a little over a mile away and still exists today; the latter is gone completely). The reservoir was finished in 1953 and began sending water the following year, although only in 1955 did it reach its planned capacity.

Forged dam inspections controversy

In 2006, after residents raised concerns regarding the soundness of both Merriman and Neversink dams, a local newspaper obtained copies of inspection reports for both and found that the handwriting and information relating to the structural soundness of the dams on many of them over a three-year period was virtually identical, suggesting they had been routinely photocopied. Only variable information, such as weather and water elevation, changed in each report.

City and state officials promised to investigate the matter and discipline any employees involved in wrongdoing. Later several were suspended indefinitely without pay.

Statistics

At full capacity, Neversink holds . The upper Neversink drains a 92-square mile (239 km²) area (the smallest of any of the city's Catskill reservoirs) reaching all the way to Slide Mountain, the Catskills' highest peak, through six towns and two counties. It is 5 miles (8 km) long and reaches a maximum depth of 175 feet (53 m).

Neversink Dam is an earthen structure 2,820 feet (859 m) long and 195 feet (60 m) high. NY 55 travels across it.

The spillway elevation is 1,440 feet (439 m) above sea level, making it the highest city reservoir.

Access and recreational use

Neversink is not as easily reached as some of the city's other Catskill reservoirs. NY 55 runs along its southern end, but that is the only road within proximity of any section. Access to the actual reservoir is tightly restricted and has been even more so since the September 11, 2001 attacks forced an increase in security.

Fishing is permitted in season with a DEP-issued permit in addition to the appropriate New York state license, and the reservoir is known, as with most Catskill fishing areas, for its trout. However boats are not allowed to leave the reservoir for environmental reasons and must be stored near it year round. Fish species present in the lake include landlocked salmon, brown trout, yellow perch, smallmouth bass, smelt, chain pickerel, black bullhead, rock bass and pumpkinseed sunfish. Hunters with valid city and state permits may also use the lands around the reservoir where hunting is permitted during the season. Beyond those, however, no recreational use of the reservoir is permitted. While the land is not fenced off, the area is regularly patrolled by uniformed DEP police.

External links
Official NYCDEP Neversink Reservoir page
Table of Reservoir Facts at the Catskill Center for Conservation and Development website.

References

Reservoirs in New York (state)
Neversink River
Catskill/Delaware watersheds
Protected areas of Sullivan County, New York
Catskill Park
Reservoirs in Sullivan County, New York